Horn Island, or Ngurupai/Narupai (pronounced Nœrupai/Nurupai) in the local language, is an island of the Torres Strait Islands archipelago located in the Torres Strait, in Queensland in Northern Australia between the Australian mainland and Papua New Guinea. It is within the locality of Horn within the Shire of Torres. The town of Wasaga is on the north-western coast of the island.

Geography

Horn Island is the site of Horn Island Airport, which also serves Thursday Island. Therefore, it is a gateway for travellers to the mainland and outer islands. The present-day population consists of islanders drawn from all islands of the Torres Strait, as well as non-islanders. Residents travel daily by ferry across the Ellis Channel to Thursday Island for work and school. Shire of Torres is the local government authority, providing the island community's municipal services.

History
Horn Island is known as Nœrupai (colloquially Nurupai) to the Kaurareg people and was given its English name by Matthew Flinders in 1802.

The town of Wasaga was named on 1 April 1971 by the Queensland Place Names Board after Wasaga Billy, the first leader of the Horn Island community.

After the 1871 massacre on Prince of Wales Island (Muralag), remnants of the people settled here for a short while, until the government relocated the Kaurareg to Hammond Island (Kœriri), where they remained until 1922.  These islands (along with the other islands in the group) are the lands of the Kaurareg, each island – or parts thereof – owned by different clans.

The language of the Kaurareg is Kala Lagaw Ya, in the form of Kaiwalgau Ya (called Kauraraigau Ya [colloquial variant Kauraregau Ya] in the 19th century).

Gold was mined on Horn Island in the 1890s. In the early 20th century, a town flourished as a result of the pearling industry, but declined when non-islander residents were evacuated to southern Queensland during World War II. A major Allied airbase, known as Horn Island Aerodrome, was constructed on the island and this was attacked several times by Japanese planes. The World War II airbase on Horn Island is described in Jack Woodward's historical biographies Under It Down Under and Singing for the Unsung. Woodward was a World War II RAAF wireless operator stationed on Horn Island.

Church influence was the London Missionary Society up until 1915 when the Anglican Church assumed responsibility.

During World War II Horn Island Seaplane Base was built at Horn Island. 

In 1946, some of the Kaurareg (Nœrupai) people moved back from Kubin on Moa Island to Horn and settled here in present-day Wasaga Village at the western end of the island. In the late 1980s, gold was mined again and Horn saw the rapid expansion of its population and building activity, as land on neighbouring Thursday Island became scarce.

The Horn Island State School opened on 1 February 1993. It became a campus of Tagai State College on 1 January 2007.

Climate
Horn Island has a very warm tropical savanna climate (Af) with consistently hot temperatures all year round. The wet season lasts from December to April and features high humidity and frequent heavy downpours. Horn Island is occasionally affected by tropical cyclones; however it is too close to the Equator for them to be a significant threat. The dry season runs from May to November, and features  lower humidity and little rainfall. Horn Island has never recorded a minimum temperature below  or a maximum temperature below .

Education 
Tagai State College is a government primary and secondary (early childhood - year 12) school for boys and girls that operates 17 campuses throughout the Torres Strait. On Horn Island, it has a primary (early childhood - year 6) campus at Nawie Street.

There is no secondary school on Horn Island; the nearest is on neighbouring Thursday Island.

Holy Family Catholic Church is in Outie Street. It is within the Thursday Island Parish of the Roman Catholic Diocese of Cairns.

See also

 List of Torres Strait Islands

References

External links

 University of Queensland: Queensland Places: Horn Island

 

informative external website

Torres Strait Islands
Towns in Queensland
Aboriginal communities in Queensland
Populated places in Far North Queensland
Torres Strait Islands communities
Queensland in World War II
Islands of Far North Queensland
Shire of Torres
Localities in Queensland